RFW was an Australian specialist vehicle manufacturer based in Chester Hill, Sydney. The firm specialized in heavy industrial vehicles including coaches, fire appliances, garbage trucks and road-rail vehicles for use in the Asia Pacific region. Many of its vehicles were all wheel drive. The RFM models featured a wide choice of original running gear for their wide range of vehicles for several roles from Bedford GM, Caterpillar, Cummins, Detroit Diesel, Nissan Diesel UD, Rolls-Royce Diesel and also Scania.

History

RFW was founded by former Royal Australian Air Force fitter Robert Frederick Whitehead. RFW completed its first vehicle in 1969, a modified 8 x 4 Bedford KM dump truck.

Output examples
6 Airport crash tenders for Royal Malaysian Air Force
6 Coach chassis for Ansett Pioneer for use in the Northern Territory
3 Road-rail vehicles for Hamersley Iron
5 Road-rail vehicles for the State Rail Authority
Sewerage pump for Brisbane City Council
Catering vehicles for Qantas

References

External links

Bus manufacturers of Australia
Fire service vehicle manufacturers
Truck manufacturers of Australia
Vehicle manufacturing companies established in 1969
1969 establishments in Australia